Chaná (endonym: Chañá or Yañá) were one of the native nations of Argentina and Uruguay. Their native language is Chaná language (lantek yañá).

Their culture was semi-nomadic. After the arrival of Europeans and the introduction of cattle, they started using leather for dressing.

Legacy
Their name was kept in a well-known local coffee brand, "Café El Chaná".

A street in Montevideo (Cordón) bears the name "Chaná".

See also
Chaná language
 Chaná mythology

References

External links
  

Indigenous peoples in Uruguay
History of Uruguay
Indigenous peoples of the Southern Cone